Lajos Sántha (13 July 1915 – 21 June 1992) was a Hungarian gymnast, born in Csorvás. He competed in gymnastics events at the 1948 Summer Olympics and the 1952 Summer Olympics. He won a bronze medal with the Hungarian team at the 1948 Summer Olympics.

References

External links
 

1915 births
1992 deaths
People from Csorvás
Hungarian male artistic gymnasts
Gymnasts at the 1948 Summer Olympics
Gymnasts at the 1952 Summer Olympics
Olympic gymnasts of Hungary
Olympic bronze medalists for Hungary
Olympic medalists in gymnastics
Medalists at the 1948 Summer Olympics
Sportspeople from Békés County
20th-century Hungarian people